The Americanos are an American electronic dance music DJ trio based in Los Angeles consisting of DJ Felli Fel, Lex Larson and Louie Rubio.

Background 
Felli Fel, a veteran DJ and radio host, formed the group alongside Lex Larson and Louie Rubio. They have collaborated with several notable hip-hop artists such as Tyga, Lil Jon, Ty Dolla $ign, French Montana, Lil Yachty and Juicy J.

History

2015 
On 14 August 2015, they released their debut single "BlackOut" featuring Lil Jon, Juicy J & Tyga. The single was featured on the We Are Your Friends movie soundtrack and in the movie Office Christmas Party. The single debuted on Billboard's Dance/Electronic songs chart at 18th.

2016 
On 11 July 2016, they released the single "In My Foreign" featuring Ty Dolla Sign, Nicky Jam, French Montana and Lil Yachty which was featured in the movie XXX: Return of Zander Cage.

Discography

Singles

As lead artist

As featured artist

References 

American DJs
American electronic musicians
Musicians from Los Angeles
Electronic dance music DJs